The 1959 San Francisco State Gators football team represented San Francisco State College—now known as San Francisco State University—as a member of the Far Western Conference (FWC) during the 1959 NCAA College Division football season. Led by tenth-year head coach Joe Verducci, San Francisco State compiled an overall record of 10–0 with a mark of 5–0 in conference play, winning the FWC title for the fourth consecutive season. For the season the team outscored its opponents 302 to 85. The Gators played home games at Cox Stadium in San Francisco.

Schedule

Notes

References

San Francisco State
San Francisco State Gators football seasons
Northern California Athletic Conference football champion seasons
College football undefeated seasons
San Francisco State Gators football